The Jagat Seth family was a wealthy merchant, banker and money lender family from Murshidabad in Bengal during the time of the Nawabs of Bengal.

History

The house was founded by Jain Hiranand Shah from Nagaur, Rajasthan, who came to Patna in 1652.
In 1707, Manikchand helped Prince Farrukhsiyar financially to become the Mughal Emperor. In award, Farrukhsiyar conferred the title of Jagat Seth on Manik Chand, the head of the family, meaning "banker or merchant of the world". This indicates the favour the family had gained at the Mughal court.

Roben Orme, the official historian of the British East India Company described Jagat Seth as the greatest banker and money changer known in the world at that time. The historian Ghulam Hussain Khan believed that "their wealth was such that there is no mentioning it without seeming to exaggerate and to deal in extravagant fables". They built up their business towards the last quarter of the 17th century and by the 18th century, it was perhaps the largest banking house in the country. In the 1750s, their entire wealth was estimated to be 14 crores. Jagat Seth was extremely influential in financial matters in Bengal and had a monopoly of minting coins there.

The Nawabs of Bengal such as Murshid Quli Khan used the credit networks of the Jagat Seth family to pay annual tribute to the Mughal Emperors in Delhi. Alivardi Khan came to the throne of Bengal in a military coup financed and planned by the Jagat Seths. According to William Dalrymple, they could "make or break anyone in Bengal, including the ruler, and their political instincts were sharp as their financial ones". Once a local businessman named Kantu borrowed money from Jagat Seth Fateh Chand and was interested in the purchase of silk. However, he failed to return the money. Indian businessmen refused to deal with the East India Company unless Kantu returned the money to Fateh Chand. This shows the great respect the local businessmen had for the Jagat Seths. Fateh Chand suffered a great loss in Delhi during Nader Shah's sack of the city in 1740, but he was able to continue his business. He died on 2 December 1744. The Jagat Seths were the most prominent moneylenders to the East India Company. 

During the Maratha invasions of Bengal, the Bargi Maratha mercenaries plundered the mansion of the Jagat Seth, taking away two and a half crore rupees as booty.

Conspiracy against Siraj ud-Daulah

Siraj ud-Daulah, the new Nawab of Bengal, alienated figures important to the interest of his state- including the Jagat Seth Mehtab Chand. The Nawab demanded a lavish tribute of 30 million rupees from the banker. Jagat Seth Mehtab Chand refused, and a result, Siraj ud-Daulah hit him. The Jagat Seth was a co-conspirator of Robert Clive against Siraj ud-Daulah, along with other alienated figures, among them prominent being- Mir Jafar, Krishnachandra Roy, Omichund, Ray Durlabh & other leading men. The Jagat Seth and other wealthy bankers funded the British for the conspiracy.

Any members of the conspiracy group had no intention to found British rule in India, instead they were just concerned about their political futures.

Decline

After the Battle of Plassey, Mir Qasim became the new Nawab. He organised the killing of several member of the family including Jagat Seth Mehtab Chand and his cousin Swarup Chand, in 1763, and threw their bodies off the ramparts off Munger Fort. Mahtab Chand's son, Kushal Chand, was granted the title of Jagat Seth, but with the transfer of the treasury and mint to Kolkata by the British, the need of a private banker at Murshidabad was vastly diminished.

Kushal Chand was only 18 years old when he became the Seth. He lacked his father Mehtab Chand's political shrewdness and was a spendthrift. Thus the fortunes of the Jagat Seths began declining. Govindchand, the next Seth, died in 1864, succeeded by Gopal Chand and Gulab Chand respectively. By then, the fortunes of the family had declined by a considerable amount. The last member of the family died in 1912, their fortunes being a thing of the past and surviving on a pension given by the British.

Museum

The house of the Jagat Seths, complete with a secret tunnel as well as an underground chamber, where illegal trade plans were hatched, has been converted into museum. House of Jagat Seth Museum was established in 1980. It is privately managed. It contains personal possessions of the Jagat Seth family including coins of the bygone era, muslin and other extravagant clothes, Banarasi sarees embroidered with gold and silver threads.

According to the Archaeological Survey of India the house, temple and ruins associated with the memory of Jagat Seth's house at Mahimapur are State Protected Monuments (Item no S-WB-94).

See also
Siraj ud-Daulah
East India Company
Nawabs of Bengal

Further reading

External links
 The Rise and Fall of the Jagat Seths
 Bengal banker Jagat Seth who gave loans to East India Company, financial tips to Aurangzeb The Print

References

Murshidabad
Jains
Rajasthani people
Bengali families